The third season of the American competitive reality television series MasterChef Junior premiered on Fox on January 6, 2015 and concluded on February 24, 2015.

The winner was Nathan Odom, a 12-year-old from San Diego, California, with 11-year-old Andrew Zappley from West Deptford Township, New Jersey finishing as the runner-up.

Top 19

Elimination table

 (WINNER) This cook won the competition.
 (RUNNER-UP) This cook finished in second place.
 (WIN) The cook won an individual challenge (Mystery Box Challenge or Elimination Test).
 (WIN) The cook was on the winning team in the Team Challenge and directly advanced to the next round.
 (HIGH) The cook was one of the top entries in the individual challenge but didn't win.
 (IN) The cook was not selected as a top or bottom entry in an individual challenge.
 (IN) The cook was not selected as a top or bottom entry in a Team Challenge.
 (IMM) The cook did not have to compete in that round of the competition and was safe from elimination.
 (LOW) The cook was one of the bottom entries in an individual challenge and advanced.
 (LOW) The cook was one of the bottom entries in a Team Challenge advanced.
 (ELIM) The cook was eliminated.

Episodes

References

2015 American television seasons
Season 3